Desi Explorers is an Indian web based travel show hosted by a group of Indian television actors. The show has currently finished its third season consisting of Desi Explorers Jordan, Desi Explorers Taiwan and Desi Explorers Yas Island (Abu Dhabi). The actors are taken to the places and are shown exploring the various sites.

Cast

Desi Explorers Jordan
Kishwer Merchantt
Sukirti Kandpal
Suyyash Rai
Vishal Singh 
Vrushika Mehta

Desi Explorers Taiwan
Jay Soni
Kishwer Merchantt
Sara Khan
Sukirti Kandpal
Surbhi Jyoti
Vrushika Mehta

Desi Explorers Yas Island
Tanya Sharma
Pooja Gor
Jay Soni
Karan Wahi 
Surbhi Jyoti 
Srishty Rode
Tina Dutta

References

External links
 

Hindi-language web series
2016 web series debuts
2010s YouTube series